The Alabama State House of Representatives is the lower house of the Alabama Legislature, the state legislature of state of Alabama. The House is composed of 105 members representing an equal number of districts, with each constituency containing at least 42,380 citizens. There are no term limits in the House. The House is also one of the five lower houses of state legislatures in the United States that is elected every four years. Other lower houses, including the United States House of Representatives, are elected for a two-year term.

The House meets at the Alabama State House in Montgomery.

Legal provisions
The Alabama House of Representatives is the lower house of the Alabama Legislature, with the upper house being the Alabama Senate. Both bodies are constitutionally required to convene annually at the Alabama State House. In quadrennial election years (e.g. 2018), they convene on the second Tuesday in January. In the first year after quadrennial election years (e.g. 2019), they convene on the first Tuesday in March. In the second and third years of quadrennium (e.g. 2020 and 2021), the Legislature convenes on the first Tuesday in February. From that date of convention, the House of Representatives must meet for 30 legislative days over the course of 105 calendar days.

The legislature is not permitted to call for special sessions, though they may determine the subject of those sessions by a two-thirds vote in the event that they do take place. Special sessions in the Alabama Legislature span 30 calendar days and meet for 12 of them.

Membership requirements
The Alabama House of Representatives consists of 105 members, each representing single-member legislative districts of equal size. State representatives have a term length of four years, uncommonly lengthy among lower legislative chambers in the United States. Members have been elected in what correspond with United States midterm election years since 1902.

In order to serve in the House, an individual must have attained the age of 21. The person must also be a qualified voter who has resided in the state of Alabama for at least three years and in their legislative district for at least one year. In accordance with Section 46 of the Constitution of Alabama, "the terms of office of the senators and representatives shall commence on the day after the general election at which they are elected, and expire on the day after the general election held in the fourth year after their election." As a result, representatives formally assume their positions on the day after Election Day in early November.

Leadership
The most powerful individual in the chamber is the Speaker of the House, who is elected by all 105 representatives. Other leadership positions include the Speaker pro tempore (also elected by the entire chamber) and the Majority Leader (elected by the majority party caucus).

The minority party is headed by the Minority Leader, who is elected by the minority party caucus.

Compensation
Constitutional Amendment 57 provides the methods for setting legislative compensation. Since 2021, representatives earn $51,734 per year. Representatives are also allotted $85 per day for single overnight stays or $100 per day for multiple overnight stays in order to accommodate lodging needs. The presiding officer of the House of Representatives earns an additional $18,000 per year.

No retirement benefits are available to representatives.

Legislative process
House bills are referred to their committees of jurisdiction by the Speaker. Bills can be introduced at any point in the legislative session.

The Governor of Alabama has the authority to use a line-item veto on appropriations bills as long as they are returned to the legislature before its adjournment. In most circumstances, during the legislative session, the Governor has six days to consider vetoing legislation before it automatically becomes law. If session has concluded, the Governor has 10 days to consider legislation. Vetoes can be overturned by a majority vote in both chambers of the Alabama Legislature.

Legislative staffing
State representatives are given year-round personal staff at the Capitol, as well as some staff who are shared between members. Representatives for select counties are entitled to shared district office staff. All committees have paid clerical staff, while only some committees have additional professional staff.

Committees
Committee members and committee chairpersons are both assigned by the Speaker.

There are currently 33 standing committees in the House. They are as follows:

 Agriculture and Forestry
 Baldwin County Legislation
 Boards, Agencies and Commissions
 Children and Senior Advocacy
 Commerce and Small Business
 Constitution, Campaigns and Elections
 County and Municipal Government
 Economic Development and Tourism
 Education Policy
 Ethics and Campaign Finance
 Financial Services
 Fiscal Responsibility
 Health
 Insurance
 Jefferson County Legislation
 Judiciary
 Lee County Legislation
 Limestone County Legislation
 Local Legislation
 Madison County Legislation
 Military and Veterans Affairs
 Mobile County Legislation
 Montgomery County Legislation
 Public Safety and Homeland Security
 Rules
 Shelby County Legislation
 State Government
 Technology and Research
 Transportation, Utilities and Infrastructure
 Tuscaloosa County Legislation

Composition

House leadership

Majority Leadership

Minority Leadership

House roster

Past composition of the House 
Throughout most of the state's history, the Democratic Party has held the majority in the Alabama House of Representatives except for a few brief exceptions.  The Whig Party controlled the lower house in 1819 and again in 1821-23, and for the last time in 1837–1838.

After the Civil War and emancipation, granting of citizenship and the franchise to freedmen, most joined the Republican Party. Politics became competitive for several years. Republicans, made up of both races, held the majority of seats during the Reconstruction period from 1868 to 1870, and again from 1872 to 1874.

Among the House's historical firsts was the election of its first African-American members in 1868, when 27 black Republicans were elected. Among those African Americans elected to the lower house in 1872 was Rev. Mentor Dotson, a teacher. His granddaughter Helen Elsie Austin in 1930 was the first African-American woman to graduate from University of Cincinnati Law School, and in 1937 the first black and first woman to be appointed as state assistant attorney general of Ohio. She had a career as counsel to several federal agencies, was active in civil rights, and served a decade as a US Foreign Service Officer in Africa.

Beginning in 1876, white Democrats regained control of the state house, through a combination of fraud, intimidation, and armed attacks on Republicans. At the turn of the 20th century, they passed laws that essentially disenfranchised both blacks and poor whites, causing a dramatic drop in voter rolls. Alabama white Democrats helped form the Solid South in Congress. For decades a failure to redistrict according to census returns resulted in the state legislature being dominated by rural counties and conservative Democrats.

In 1922 the first female member was elected to the State House: Hattie Hooker Wilkins of Dallas County, who served a single four-year term.

There was a realignment of party affiliations during the later 20th century. In the 1970s the ruling of one man, one vote by the US Supreme Court enabled urban jurisdictions to acquire political power in the State House that expressed the size of their populations. Through the late 20th century, after the civil rights movement, white conservatives began to realign, supporting Republican presidential candidates. Most blacks in the state supported the national Democratic Party, which had supported constitutional rights. At the local and state level, numerous Democrats were elected.

Some 136 years of Democratic control of the State House ended in November 2010. Beginning with the 2010 General Election Republicans swept to a large majority in the state house. They increased this margin in the elections in 2014 and 2018.

See also
 Government of Alabama
 Alabama Senate
 Alabama Republican Party
 Alabama Democratic Party

References

External links
Alabama House of Representatives Official Site

 
House of Representatives
State lower houses in the United States
Politics of Alabama